Denseisha (電盛社) is a Japanese information technology Kabushiki gaisha founded by Takashi Mizawa (三澤 隆) in October 1920. Currently, the corporation headquartered in Kumamoto employs 271 workers at the seven main offices
 the headquarters, IT and ET administration in Kumamoto,
 the system engineering technology center in Kumamoto,
 a branch office in Fukuoka,
 the "solution center" in Fukuoka,
 the "mobile engineering office" in Fukuoka and
 a sales office in Urasoe.

The service field comprises the development and installation of enterprise and hospital network as well as the design of electric, IT and personnel communication facilities.

References

Technology companies of Japan
Technology companies established in 1920
1920 establishments in Japan